Special Support Group (SSG) is a unit of Inter-Services of Pakistan Armed Forces, having active since 2009, responsible for the relief and rehabilitation of Internally Displaced Persons (IDP) during War on Terror. The Special Support Group is an extended addition of special operations command of uniformed Inter-Services and the civilians, to provide support to executive difficult operations in civilian based areas, military logistics, security assistance, and administration.

It was given commissioned on 12 May 2009 to support internally displaced persons.  Its first operational field commander was Lieutenant-General Nadeem Ahmad who played vital role in administratively leading the unit to execute the refugee operation in 2009.

See also
Pakistan Armed Forces

References

Military special forces of Pakistan